Captain Garth Neville Walford  (27 May 1882 – 26 April 1915) was a British Army officer and recipient of the Victoria Cross, the highest and most prestigious award for gallantry in the face of the enemy that can be awarded to British and Commonwealth forces.

Biography
Walford was born to Colonel Neville Walford (Royal Artillery) and his wife at No 5, The Terrace in Camberley, which is now part of the Royal Military Academy Sandhurst.

Walford was listed as a ′University Candidate′ when he was commissioned into the British Army as a second lieutenant in the Royal Field Artillery on 24 December 1902.

He had advanced to captain during the First World War, and was awarded a Victoria Cross for his actions on 26 April 1915 at the V Beach, Gallipoli, Turkey. After his senior officers had been killed, Walford and Charles Hotham Montagu Doughty-Wylie organised a successful attack targeted on the old fort at the top of the hill, although both men were killed in the battle.

Walford was 32 years old when he died, and married to Elizabeth Walford. He is buried in V Beach Cemetery.

Citation

References

Sources
 Monuments to Courage (David Harvey, 1999)
 The Register of the Victoria Cross (This England, 1997)
 VCs of the First World War - Gallipoli (Stephen Snelling, 1995)

1882 births
1915 deaths
Military personnel from Surrey
Royal Field Artillery officers
British Army personnel of World War I
British Gallipoli campaign recipients of the Victoria Cross
British military personnel killed in World War I
People from Frimley
People educated at Harrow School
Alumni of Balliol College, Oxford
British Army recipients of the Victoria Cross
Burials at V Beach Commonwealth War Graves Commission Cemetery